The Naphtha Hill Decauville Railway  was a  long horse-drawn railway with a gauge of , which was supplied by the French company Decauville. Its track and rolling stock were originally used during the construction of the Transcaspian Railway to transport the rails and sleepers to the construction site using two oil-fired Decauville steam locomotives with works numbers N° 9 and N° 10.

History 
As soon as the broad-gauge tracks had been laid, the narrow-gauge tracks were dismantled at the start of the narrow-gauge line and laid to new construction sites at the end of the line. By the time the broad-gauge railroad to Serdar was completed, the Decauville line was already running to Bami.

The ozokerite could be used to produce naphtha fuel for the broad-gauge locomotives. It had previously to be delivered from Baku or the Cheleken Peninsula. As a result of this discovery, the Decauville railway was moved to Naphtha Hill (Neftjanaja Gora). It transported all the fuel for the locomotives of the broad-gauge line.

The line was presumably always operated only by horses. At least, it was called a horse-drawn tramway in 1887. In 1889 the line was already closed.

Today, a shorter broad-gauge line runs straight from Balkanabat to Uzboý on Naphtha Hill (also known until 1939 as Neftedag or gora Neftjanaja in Turkmen language, i.e. literally Naphtha or Petrol Hill, and until 2003 as imeni 26 Bakinskich Kommissarow in Russian).

Location
The horse-drawn railway connected Bala-Ischem railway station with Naphtha Hill. On the way back the extracted naphtha was transported from the mine to the Transcaspian Railway.

The Bala-Ischem station was located on the Transcaspian Railway.

The Naphtha mountain is of only insignificant height. The actual Naphtha mountain consists of a mountain range running from southwest to northeast of about  length and  width. I has no particularly steep slopes and gradually descends in the longitudinal direction to the level of the steppe. Parallel to the mountain, there are smaller hills on its north and south sides.

Route and geology 
On the first  behind the station, the route led over a flat steppe area consisting of prehistoric clay mixed with sand, in which numerous round-cut stones, mostly less than the size of hazelnuts, are embedded.

From the fifth kilometre (third mile) onwards, the route led through brown hills consisting of clay layers with dense horizontal stratification. These formations are probably sediments from the nearby old riverbed of the Usboj, to which the section shortly afterwards led down without any noticeable difference in level. At this point, the river must have expanded into a wide, very shallow lake or pond. The ground here is saturated with salt, like the ponds on both sides of the railway wall, in which several centimetres thick, white or light bark of pure salt was present. Layers of pure salt were found everywhere under the surface. No grass grew in this desert, and no trace of life made itself felt. The only stones encountered were broken pieces of salt, and along the way there was a house built entirely of carved salt blocks, which was not damaged by the weak rain that rarely occurred in this area.

From the 24th kilometre (15th mile) on, dunes and drifting sand began to form, they continued and multiplied the closer one came to Naphtha Hill. This section was in constant battle with the moving sand mountains and required constant shifting and renewal of the route. In the valley behind the ring wall-like elevation, the horse-drawn carriage led to the drilling rigs No. 1 and No. 2, which stood on layers of sand and grey, sandy clay. On the southern slope of the mountain there were layers strongly saturated with asphalt. On the ridge there were springs from which salty water, naphtha and hydrocarbon gas came. The westernmost of these springs was about  higher than the drilling rigs. Black, thick naphtha floated on its surface. Small pieces or spheres of earth wax rose together with the naphtha in this spring. The wax was brown, kneadable, and had an aromatic odor. It accumulated at the edges of the spring and the associated outlet channel. The quality was not particularly good, as it was coffee or chocolate brown, while the better Galician earth wax was yellow. It was assumed that there had to be considerable amounts of earth wax in the depths, as quite a lot flowed out.

Locomotives 
In Turkestan, two oil-fired Decauville steam locomotives were used on the track material of the constructor's railway, which was subsequently reused to build the horse-drawn tramway. It is not known whether these locomotives were still in working order during the construction and operation of the Naphtha Hill line around 1885.

References

External links 
 Route of the former horse-drawn Decauville railway from Bala-Ischem to Naphtha Hill
 Satellite photo of the broad-gauge railway from Balkanabat/Nebit-Dag to Naphtha Hill
 Map 1909
 Map of 1940 with old Decauville railway and new broad-gauge railway

Railway lines in Turkmenistan
Railway lines opened in 1885
Railway lines opened in 1889
500 mm gauge railways
Decauville